WMSG is a Classic Hits formatted broadcast radio station licensed to Oakland, Maryland, serving Oakland and Garrett County, Maryland. WMSG is owned and operated by Broadcast Communications II, Inc.

History

Beginnings
WMSG first signed on the air May 19, 1963, under the ownership of Oakland Radio Station Corporation, a company headed by C.W. Englander.  Thomas Butscher served as the station's general manager and program director.  The station first operated at a daytime-only power of 500 watts and played mostly country music.

In 1966, WMSG-FM signed on the air.  The station was primarily a simulcast outlet of WMSG, to provide Oakland with local radio service after WMSG was mandated to shut down after sunset.

In 1985, WMSG was granted a construction permit to double its power to 1,000 watts, but still daytime only.  The upgrades were completed the following year.  By the end of the decade, WMSG had been granted permission to operate at 75 watts nighttime power, and Kenneth Robertson had become president of Oakland Radio Station Corporation.  By 1995, Brenda Butscher had become president of the company.

Sales and aftermath
After more than three decades of ownership, Oakland Radio Station Corporation decided to sell WMSG and its sister station on February 21, 1995, for $200,000 to Oakland Media Group.  The sale became final on May 8, 1995.  Al Devine was the new company president.

In July 2009 WMSG and sisters WKHJ-FM and WWHC were sold for $830,000 to Pennsylvania-based Radiowerks Broadcasting.

WMSG today
In May 2011, WMSG and its sister stations were ordered into receivership from Radiowerks Broadcasting by the Garrett County, Maryland Circuit Court. John Culp was appointed as receiver. The Federal Communications Commission approved the transfer of the license on May 19, 2011. The three stations were transferred to Broadcast Communications II, Inc. effective July 1, 2013 at a purchase price of $775,000.

See also
 WMSG's Studios on Google StreetView

References

External links
Classic Hits 1050 WMSG Online

MSG